Switzerland was represented by Furbaz, with the song "Viver senza tei", at the 1989 Eurovision Song Contest, which took place on 6 May in Lausanne, following Céline Dion's victory for Switzerland the previous year. Furbaz was the winner of the Swiss national final for the contest, held on 18 February.

Before Eurovision

National final 
The Swiss German broadcaster SF DRS was in charge of broadcasting the Swiss National final for the 1989 contest. The final was held at the Theater Casino in Zug, hosted by Raymond Fein. Ten songs were selected for the Swiss entry and the winner was selected by 3 regional juries representing each linguistic region of Switzerland (DRS, TSR, TSI), a jury consisting of members of the press, and a jury consisting of music professionals.

At Eurovision
On the night Furbaz performed 18th in the running order, following Cyprus and preceding Greece. At the close of voting, "Viver senza tei" had picked up 47 points, placing Switzerland in 13th place out of 22 entries. As of 2022, "Viver senza tei" has been the only Swiss song in the competition to be sung in the Romansh language. The Swiss jury awarded its 12 points to Greece.

The Swiss entry was conducted at the contest by the musical director Benoît Kaufman.

Voting

References

External links
  Swiss National Final 1989

1989
Countries in the Eurovision Song Contest 1989
Eurovision